Dantes Ingin Tsitsi (b. September 28, 1959) is a Nauruan politician.

Political role

Tsitsi was elected to Parliament in the 2007 general elections, gaining the seat of Godfrey Thoma and representing the constituency of Aiwo. He was re-elected in the 2008 snap elections, and then in the April 2010 election, but lost his seat in the June 2010 election, where he was the only incumbent to be defeated.

Family background

Tsitsi is a close relative of former parliamentarian Edwin Tsitsi, a member of the first Parliament in 1968. Nauru's politics tend to be somewhat family oriented.

References

See also
 Politics of Nauru
 Elections in Nauru
 2008 Nauruan parliamentary election

Members of the Parliament of Nauru
1959 births
Living people
People from Aiwo District
21st-century Nauruan politicians